Pyrrolnitrin is an antifungal antibiotic. Pseudomonas pyrrocinia and other Pseudomonas species produce pyrrolnitrin from tryptophan as secondary metabolite. The fungicides fenpiclonil and fludioxonil are chemically related to pyrrolnitrin.

References

Antifungals